Tommy Peoples (20 September 1948 – 4 August 2018) was an Irish fiddler who played in the Donegal fiddle tradition.

Biography

Peoples was born near St. Johnston, County Donegal, Ireland. He was a member of traditional Irish music groups, including The Bothy Band as well as performing solo from the late 1960s. He played in the fiddle style of East Donegal. After moving to Dublin in the 1960s, where he was employed as a Garda (member of the Irish police force), he subsequently moved to County Clare and married Mary Linnane (daughter of Kitty Linnane, long-time leader of the Kilfenora Céilí Band). The family lived in St Johnston. His daughter, Siobhán Peoples, is also a fiddler.

Peoples was the Traditional Musician In Residence at The Balor Arts Centre, Ballybofey, County Donegal. In July 2015, he launched a self-published book, Ó Am go hAm - From Time to Time. The book combines a fiddle tutor by Peoples, along with illustrations and a complete notation of 130 original tunes by Peoples. The book also includes many stories and incidents from his life and musical career. He died on 4 August 2018, aged 70.

Discography

With The Bothy Band 
 The Bothy Band (1975)

Solo 
 An Exciting Session with One of Ireland's Leading Traditional Fiddlers (1976)
 The High Part of the Road (1976) [accompanied by Paul Brady]
 A Traditional Experience with Tommy Peoples: A Master Irish Traditional Fiddle Player (1976)
 The Iron Man (1985) [accompanied by Dáithí Sproule]
 Fiddler's Fancy: Fifty Irish Fiddle Tunes Collected and Performed by the Irish Fiddle Legend (1986) [accompanied by Manus Lunny]
 Traditional Irish Music Played on the Fiddle (released in 1993, but recorded in 1982)
 The Quiet Glen/An Gleann Ciuin (1998) [accompanied by Alph Duggan]
 Waiting for a Call (2003)

With Matt Molloy and Paul Brady 
 Matt Molloy . Paul Brady . Tommy Peoples (1977)

With Paul Brady 
 Welcome Here Kind Stranger (1978; remastered on CD in 2009)  [Peoples plays on four tracks]

References

External links 
 Tommy Peoples's web site
 Ceolas Artist History - Tommy Peoples
 Interview with Tommy Peoples by Fiddler Magazine

Bibliography
 Sarah Lifton (1983) The Listener's Guide to Folk Music, p. 74,  .
 Harry Long (2005) The Waltons Guide to Irish Music, p. 309-10,  .
 Neal Walters & Brian Mansfield (ed.) (1998) MusicHound Folk: The Essential Album Guide, p. 623-5,  (the source of his birth date).

1948 births
2018 deaths
Garda Síochána officers
Irish fiddlers
Musicians from County Donegal
The Bothy Band members